Lawrence County is the southernmost county located in the U.S. state of Ohio. As of the 2020 census, the population was 58,240. Its county seat is Ironton. The county was created in 1815 and later organized in 1817. It is named for James Lawrence, the naval officer famous for the line "do not give up the ship".
Lawrence County is part of the Huntington–Ashland metropolitan area.

History
The earliest European-American settlers, Luke Kelly and his family, and May Keyser, settled at Hanging Rock along the Ohio River in 1796, having migrated from the east.  Lawrence County was formed on December 20, 1816, from parts of Gallia and Scioto counties, with the county seat named as Burlington. In 1851 the county seat was moved from Burlington to Ironton. A new courthouse was built at that time. It burned in 1857.  The present Lawrence County Courthouse was built in 1908.

Men from Lawrence County served in the Mexican–American War, with at least one having died during that conflict.  By 1862, about 3,200 of Lawrence County's men were soldiers in the Union Army in the American Civil War. During World War I, 2,200 of Lawrence County's men served in the armed forces, and 99 died.

When first settled, Lawrence County was rich in natural resources such as iron, timber, coal, natural gas, oil, and salt. By the beginning of the twentieth century, many of these had been depleted by resource extraction and industrial development.

Geography
It is the southernmost county in the state of Ohio and part of Appalachian Ohio.

Adjacent counties
 Jackson County (north)
 Gallia County (northeast)
 Cabell County, West Virginia (southeast)
 Wayne County, West Virginia (south)
 Boyd County, Kentucky (southwest)
 Greenup County, Kentucky (southwest)
 Scioto County (northwest)

National protected area
 Wayne National Forest (part)

Demographics

2000 census
As of the census of 2000, there were 62,319 people, 24,732 households, and 17,807 families living in the county. There were 27,189 housing units at an average density of 60 per square mile (23/km2). The racial makeup of the county was 96.55% White, 2.09% Black or African American, 0.18% Native American, 0.19% Asian, 0.01% Pacific Islander, 0.11% from other races, and 0.88% from two or more races. 0.57% of the population were Hispanic or Latino of any race.

There were 24,732 households, out of which 32.00% had children under the age of 18 living with them, 56.00% were married couples living together, 11.90% had a female householder with no husband present, and 28.00% were non-families. 24.90% of all households were made up of individuals, and 11.20% had someone living alone who was 65 years of age or older. The average household size was 2.49 and the average family size was 2.96.

In the county, the population was spread out, with 24.50% under the age of 18, 8.60% from 18 to 24, 28.00% from 25 to 44, 24.50% from 45 to 64, and 14.40% who were 65 years of age or older. The median age was 38 years. For every 100 females there were 92.20 males. For every 100 females age 18 and over, there were 88.40 males.

The median income for a household in the county was $29,127, and the median income for a family was $35,308. Males had a median income of $30,622 versus $20,961 for females. The per capita income for the county was $14,678. About 15.10% of families and 18.90% of the population were below the poverty line, including 27.30% of those under age 18 and 12.90% of those age 65 or over.

2010 census
As of the 2010 United States Census, there were 62,450 people, 24,974 households, and 17,405 families living in the county. The racial makeup of the county was 95.9% white, 2.0% black or African American, 0.4% Asian, 0.2% American Indian, 0.2% from other races, and 1.4% from two or more races. Those of Hispanic or Latino origin made up 0.7% of the population. In terms of ancestry, 18.0% were American, 15.4% were German, 12.9% were Irish, and 10.8% were English. In Lawrence County, less than 1% of people who self-identify as "Irish" are Catholic. Scholars believe this is part of a trend in which people are vaguely aware that at least some of their ancestors come from Ireland, but that population is primarily of "Scots-Irish" or "Ulster Scots" ancestry, and those identifying as "Irish" are simply unaware of the distinction. Those citing "American" ancestry in Lawrence County are of overwhelmingly English extraction, most English Americans identify simply as American because their ancestors have been in North America for centuriesin some cases since the 1600s.

Of the 24,974 households, 32.9% had children under the age of 18 living with them, 51.0% were married couples living together, 13.2% had a female householder with no husband present, 30.3% were non-families, and 26.1% of all households were made up of individuals. The average household size was 2.47 and the average family size was 2.95. The median age was 40.1 years.

The median income for a household in the county was $36,461 and the median income for a family was $46,732. Males had a median income of $38,170 versus $28,251 for females. The per capita income for the county was $19,452. About 15.2% of families and 19.4% of the population were below the poverty line, including 28.0% of those under age 18 and 11.9% of those age 65 or over.

Politics
Lawrence County tends to support the Republican Party in presidential elections. Bill Clinton was the last Democrat to win the county, in 1996 -- a distinction shared with 16 other Ohio counties, mostly in this region. Despite this fact, Democrats continued to crack 40% in election years.

|}

Government
Lawrence County has a 3-member Board of County Commissioners that oversee the various County departments, similar to all but 2 of the 88 Ohio counties. Lawrence County's elected commissioners are:
 County Commissioners: Colton Copley (R), Deanna Holliday (R), and Mike Finley (R).

Other Lawrence County Elected Officials: County Auditor (R) Paul David Knipp, County Treasurer (R) Tresa Baker, Clerk of Courts (D) Mike Patterson, Sheriff (R) Jeff Lawless, County Recorder (R) Sharon Gossett-Hager.

Primary Political Parties: Lawrence County Democratic Party, Lawrence County Republican Party

Communities

City
 Ironton (county seat)

Villages
 Athalia
 Chesapeake
 Coal Grove
 Hanging Rock
 Proctorville
 South Point

Townships

 Aid
 Decatur
 Elizabeth
 Fayette
 Hamilton
 Lawrence
 Mason
 Perry
 Rome
 Symmes
 Union
 Upper
 Washington
 Windsor

Census-designated places
 Burlington
 Miller

Unincorporated communities
 Eifort
 Etna
 Firebrick
 Kitts Hill
 Pedro
 Rock Camp
 Scottown
 Waterloo
 Willow Wood

See also
 National Register of Historic Places listings in Lawrence County, Ohio

References

External links
 Lawrence County Sheriff
 Lawrence County Chamber of Commerce
 Lawrence Register

 
Appalachian Ohio
Counties of Appalachia
Ohio counties on the Ohio River
1817 establishments in Ohio